George Maderos (November 3, 1933 – February 2, 2017) was an American football player who played for San Francisco 49ers of the National Football League (NFL). He played college football at California State University, Chico.  He served as the head football coach at Chico State from 1958 to 1967, compiling a record of 35–59–1.

Head coaching record

References

External links
 

1933 births
2017 deaths
American football defensive backs
Chico State Wildcats football coaches
Chico State Wildcats football players
San Francisco 49ers players
Sportspeople from Chico, California
Coaches of American football from California
Players of American football from California